Westree railway station is located in the community of Westree, Sudbury District, Ontario, Canada. This station is currently in use by Via Rail. Transcontinental Canadian trains stop here.

External links
 Westree railway station

Via Rail stations in Ontario
Railway stations in Sudbury District